Jeffrey A. Bluestone (born  1954) is the A.W. and Mary Margaret Clausen Distinguished Professor of Metabolism and Endocrinology at the University of California, San Francisco (as of January 2022), and was, for a number of years, an earlier executive vice chancellor and provost of that university. He began the UCSF affiliation in 2000, after earlier extended positions at the NCI-NIH, and at The University of Chicago. Bluestone earned his undergraduate and masters degrees in microbiology from Rutgers State University, and his doctoral degree in immunology from Cornell Graduate School of Medical Science. His current research is focused on understanding T cell activation and immune tolerance in autoimmunity and organ transplantation. As of April 2016, he was also serving as the president and CEO of the Parker Institute for Cancer Immunotherapy, but since left to become the Chief Executive Officer and President of Sonoma Biotherapeutics in 2019.

Early life and education
Jeffrey A. Bluestone was born ca. 1954. He earned his B.S. in biology and M.S. in microbiology from Rutgers State University, in 1974 and 1977, respectively. He earned his Ph.D. in immunology from the Sloan-Kettering division of the Cornell Graduate School of Medical Science, in 1980, under the supervision of Carlos Lopez.

Career

Bluestone started his career in a series of positions at the National Cancer Institute, a part of the National Institutes of Health, where he rose over a period of 7 years to become a senior investigator in the NCI's Immunology Branch. He then took a position at The University of Chicago as a member of the Ben May Institute for Cancer Research, and as an associate professor (in pathology). Over 13 years—from 1987 to 2000—he rose to become chairman of the University's Committee on Immunology, and director of that institute, a role he served in from 1995 to 2000.

In 2000, he moved to the University of California, San Francisco, to direct the UCSF Diabetes Center and metabolic research unit. Beginning at least 2011, Bluestone headed the Immune Tolerance Network, a consortium of over 1000 scientists to focus efforts on the development of immune tolerance therapies, a position that as of January 2022 he listed as a previous one at his UCSF profile. At one time, he was in leadership at the Brehm Coalition; as of January 2022 he was listed as an emeritus member there.

Bluestone became UCSF's interim vice chancellor of research in 2008. In 2009, the efforts of a UCSF committee led by Bluestone made that university a leading institutional recipient of science-directed funds available to universities from the American Recovery and Reinvestment Act. He became executive vice chancellor and provost of UCSF in 2010, a position he held until 2015. As provost, as of 2011 he had set up collaborations with Pfizer, Sanofi-Aventis, and Bayer, as well as many other UCSF-industry collaborations.

As of January 2022, Bluestone is the A.W. and Mary Margaret Clausen Distinguished Professor of Metabolism and Endocrinology, and the director of the Hormone Research Institute in the Diabetes Center at UCSF. (He is a previous director of the Diabetes Center, per se.) As of April 2016, he was serving as the president and CEO of the Parker Institute for Cancer Immunotherapy.

Since this date, Bluestone has been a member of the editorial board for Immunity.

Research

As of January 2022, Bluestone's research group focuses on studying the role of T cell receptors on regulatory T cells ("Tregs"). In the early 90s, he identified the role of CD28 and its interaction with CTLA-4 The development of soluble receptors of CTLA-4 led to the development of the drugs abatacept and later belatacept. Further work with James P. Allison to target CTLA-4 resulted in the development of immune checkpoint therapies also known as immunotherapy. This led to the clinical development of ipilimumab (Yervoy™), which was approved in 2011 by the FDA for the treatment of metastatic melanoma. Their current work on understanding Tregs has been discussed as an avenue to further developments in the treatment Type 1 Diabetes.

Awards and recognition
Bluestone was elected as a fellow to the American Academy of Arts and Sciences in 2006, and as a member of the National Academy of Medicine.

He has received the Mary Tyler Moore and Robert Levine Excellence in Clinical Research Award from the Juvenile Diabetes Research Foundation, and an award for distinguished alumni from his doctoral institution.

References

External links 
UCSF Bio

Living people
Place of birth missing (living people)
Cancer researchers
University of California, San Francisco faculty
Rutgers University alumni
Weill Cornell Medical College alumni
American immunologists
Members of the National Academy of Medicine
University of Chicago faculty
1954 births